Martin Johannes Sebastian Isepp (30 September 1930 – 25 December 2011) was an Austrian‐born British pianist, harpsichordist, conductor and teacher. He had an international career, and worked with leading singers for several decades. Among those with whom he performed were Janet Baker, Hugues Cuénod, Hans Hotter and Elisabeth Schwarzkopf. For more than forty years he was associated with Glyndebourne Festival Opera, and he held posts in opera houses and music academies in Britain, continental Europe and North America.

Life and career
In 1938 the Isepps fled from Vienna to Britain, where Sebastian secured posts at the National Gallery in London and the Ashmolean Museum in Oxford.

After studying at Lincoln College, Oxford and the Royal College of Music, Isepp joined Benjamin Britten's English Opera Group in 1954. In 1957 he joined the music staff of Glyndebourne Festival Opera, where he served for 34 years, in capacities including chief music coach 1973–78 and head of the music staff 1978–93. From 1994 until 2007 he returned annually as chief guest coach. Apart from his work at Glyndebourne, Isepp was head of opera training at the Juilliard School in New York from 1973 to 1977. He was appointed head of music studies at the National Opera Studio in London in 1978, and was head of the academy of singing at the Banff Centre in Alberta, Canada, from 1981 to 1993.

Isepp frequently conducted performances by Glyndebourne's touring company, and was an associate conductor of the Metropolitan Opera, New York. Between 2006 and 2008 he was head of music at the Opera Akademie of the Royal Danish Opera in Copenhagen. As an accompanist, Isepp performed with singers including Janet Baker, Hugues Cuénod, Hans Hotter, Elisabeth Schwarzkopf, John Shirley-Quirk, Elisabeth Söderström and Frederica von Stade. As a harpsichordist or pianist he took part in recordings of operas by Britten and Handel.

Isepp died in London at the age of 81. He was survived by his widow, Rose (née Harris), whom he married in 1966. They had three sons, one of whom predeceased him. Janet Baker described Isepp as "one of the most deeply sensitive musicians I have ever met ... I do not know of anyone in our profession who is regarded with more affection". The obituarist in The Independent wrote:

Videography
 Glyndebourne Festival Opera: a Gala Evening (1992), Arthaus Musik DVD, 100-432, 2004

Notes

1930 births
2011 deaths
Classical accompanists
Austrian refugees
British classical pianists
Male classical pianists
British harpsichordists
British male conductors (music)
British music educators
English people of Austrian descent
20th-century classical pianists
20th-century British conductors (music)
20th-century British male musicians